Agrius rothschildi is a moth of the  family Sphingidae. It is known from New Caledonia. Agrius rothschildi is a replacement name for Sphinx fasciatus.

It is similar to Agrius luctifera but the wings and body have a vinaceous tint and the mesonotal yellow spots are absent. The black dorsal line on the abdomen is sharply marked.

References

Agrius (moth)
Moths described in 2000
Moths of Oceania